Spring Break…Here to Party is a compilation album by American country music artist Luke Bryan. It was released on March 5, 2013, by Capitol Nashville. The album is a compilation of songs from Bryan's first four spring break-themed EPs, plus two new songs, "Buzzkill" and "Just a Sip." A music video was filmed for "Buzzkill" though it was never released as a single.

Reception

Critical
Stephen Thomas Erlewine of AllMusic gave the album three stars out of five, writing that "not one song is undeniable, the kind that works into the subconscious, but that doesn't really matter, as this is just breezy fun, a collection of cheerful drinking songs that never threaten to careen out of control."

Commercial
The album sold 150,000 copies in its first week of release, becoming Bryan's first number one album on the Billboard 200 chart. The album has sold 605,000 copies in the US as of May 2015.

Track listing

Personnel
Eli Beaird – bass guitar
Larry Beaird – acoustic guitar
Mike Brignardello – bass guitar
Jim "Moose" Brown – Hammond B-3 organ, piano
Luke Bryan – lead vocals
Pat Buchanan – electric guitar
Perry Coleman – background vocals
J.T. Corenflos – electric guitar
Howard Duck – Hammond B-3 organ, piano
Shannon Forrest – drums, percussion
Kenny Greenberg – electric guitar
Rob Hajacos – fiddle, mandolin
Wes Hightower – background vocals
Mark Hill – bass guitar
Steve Hinson – lap steel guitar, pedal steel guitar
Wayne Killius – percussion
Jeff King – electric guitar
Troy Lancaster – electric guitar
Tim Lauer – Hammond B-3 organ, piano
Brent Mason – electric guitar
Pat McGrath – acoustic guitar
Greg Morrow – drums, percussion
Duncan Mullins – bass guitar
Russ Pahl – lap steel guitar, pedal steel guitar
Michael Payne – electric guitar
Brian Pruitt – drums, percussion
Mike Rojas – Hammond B-3 organ, piano, accordion
Adam Shoenfeld – electric guitar
Hank Singer – fiddle, mandolin
Jimmie Lee Sloas – bass guitar
Joe Spivey – bouzouki, fiddle, mandolin
Jeff Stevens – background vocals
Jody Stevens – beats, programming
Russell Terrell – background vocals
Ilya Toshinsky – acoustic guitar
John Willis – acoustic guitar, electric guitar
Lonnie Wilson – drums, percussion

Charts and certifications

Weekly charts

Year-end charts

Certifications

References

2013 compilation albums
Luke Bryan albums
Capitol Records compilation albums